Gregory Koukl (born June 10, 1950) is a Christian apologist and radio talk show host. He is the founder of the Christian apologetics organization Stand to Reason. 

He is married to Steese Koukl and lives near Hermosa Beach, California.

Education and work
Koukl received an M.A. in Philosophy of Religion and Ethics from Talbot School of Theology, and also an M.A. in Christian apologetics from Simon Greenleaf School of Law.

In 1993 Koukl founded Stand to Reason, an organization dedicated to training those supporting his Christian viewpoints to defend their faith with "knowledge, wisdom, and character". Stand to Reason produces a weekly radio program, audio podcasts, articles, and video materials.  Stand To Reason ended its radio program on KBRT, its flagship station, on 6 December 2015. Stand to Reason sponsors mission trips in which students encounter those with opposing points of view, including Mormons and atheists.

His book "Tactics: A Game Plan for Discussing Your Christian Convictions" was cited as a must read on how to share Christian beliefs and defend Christianity in an article on the Christian Post.

 
 
 
 
 

Contributions to other books
 

Radio broadcast

References

External links
 Official Stand to Reason website
 www.veritas.org - Online video lecture: Moral Relativism: Feet Firmly Planted in Midair

1950 births
20th-century Calvinist and Reformed theologians
21st-century Calvinist and Reformed theologians
American Calvinist and Reformed theologians
American evangelicals
American male non-fiction writers
American radio personalities
Christian apologists
Christian Old Earth creationists
Critics of atheism
Living people
Talbot School of Theology alumni